Conrad Nagel Theater is a 30-minute American anthology series originally airing in first-run syndication from January 26, 1955 - July 14, 1955. Re-runs aired in syndication from 1956–1958. Conrad Nagel was the host. A total of 25 episodes were adapted from classical literature, including the stories of William Shakespeare, Geofrey Chaucer, Leo Tolstoy, Guy de Maupassant, Prosper Mérimée, and Alexander Pushkin.

The program was a production of Guild films. Its initial episode, "The Storm", starred Peter Trent, Betty Metcalf, and John Douglas. Another episode featured Sebastian Cabot in The Sandman.

References

External links

Conrad Nagel Theater at CVTA
The Sandman episode of Conrad Nagel Theater on YouTube

1950s American anthology television series
1955 American television series debuts
1955 American television series endings
Black-and-white American television shows
First-run syndicated television programs in the United States